The Chicagoan and Kansas Cityan were a pair of American named passenger trains operated by the Atchison, Topeka and Santa Fe Railway. They ran from Chicago, Illinois to Wichita, Kansas, with a later extension to Oklahoma City.

History 
On April 17, 1938, the Santa Fe introduced a pair of day trains using lightweight, streamlined cars from the Budd Company, and numbered trains 11 and 12. These two, seven-car, lightweight, streamlined trains operated the  route in 12 3/4 hours between endpoints. In December of 1939, the train's western terminal would be moved to Oklahoma City, extending running times by three hours. At the same time, The Tulsan, streamlined diesel train 211 and 212, was introduced, carrying through chair cars taken off 11 to and from Tulsa, Oklahoma, and adding through Tulsa-Chicago cars to train 12. This allowed the service to compete with the new Frisco Firefly.

The inaugural runs of the two lightweight streamliners were operated with Electro-Motive Corporation E1A units numbered 8 and 9. However, within a month, Santa Fe rebuilt the old Santa Fe Box Cab Diesel passenger units 1A and 1B as single-cab units for the new trains, and assigned them the road numbers 1 and 10. After being rebuilt in Santa Fe's Topeka shops with an elevated cab over a new snub nose and new AAR 1B drop-equalizer trucks, and painted  in the Santa Fe "war bonnet" paint scheme, they replaced the newer E-units. 

The Chicagoan and Kansas Cityan received new full-length "Big Dome" lounges in 1954. after the war, trains 111 and 112 carried a portion of the train (including a new sleeping car) to Dallas via Ft. Worth and Cleburne. This extension disappeared in 1957, and reappeared in 1960. The trains were discontinued in their entirety in 1968.

Train consists

At the train's inception, each of the two trainsets consisted of the following units:

 One EMC E1A  Diesel locomotive
 One Baggage  or Railway Post Office car
 Three 52 seat coaches
 One 26 seat coach or 30-seat club lounge car
 One 48 seat dining car
 One 32 seat parlor observation

Notes

References

Passenger trains of the Atchison, Topeka and Santa Fe Railway
Named passenger trains of the United States
Railway services introduced in 1938
Railway services discontinued in 1968